Peter Podhradský (born December 10, 1979) is a Slovak professional ice hockey defenceman who is currently a free agent having last played for HC Bratislava in the Slovak 2. Liga.

Playing career 
Podhradský was drafted 134th overall by the Mighty Ducks of Anaheim in the 2000 NHL Entry Draft and spent three seasons with their American Hockey League affiliate the Cincinnati Mighty Ducks but never managed to play in the NHL.  He went to the Czech Republic and then back to Slovakia before signing for the Frankfurt Lions for the 2006–07 season where he was the team's top scoring defenceman with 17 goals and 19 assists for 36 points in 45 games.

On August 12, 2014, with HC Donbass suspending operations due to civil unrest, Podhradský signed a one-year contract with HC Lada Togliatti for the 2014–15 season.

Career statistics

Regular season and playoffs

International

References

External links

1979 births
Barys Nur-Sultan players
Cincinnati Mighty Ducks players
Slovak expatriate ice hockey players in Russia
Frankfurt Lions players
HC Dinamo Minsk players
HC Donbass players
HC Košice players
HC Lada Togliatti players
HC Dynamo Pardubice players
Living people
Anaheim Ducks draft picks
Slovak ice hockey defencemen
Torpedo Nizhny Novgorod players
Slovak expatriate sportspeople in Belarus
Slovak expatriate sportspeople in Kazakhstan
Expatriate ice hockey players in Belarus
Expatriate ice hockey players in Kazakhstan
Slovak expatriate ice hockey players in Germany
Slovak expatriate ice hockey players in the Czech Republic
Slovak expatriate ice hockey players in the United States
Slovak expatriate sportspeople in Ukraine
Expatriate ice hockey players in Ukraine